The 1968 Suisse Open Gstaad was a combined men's and women's professional tennis tournament played on outdoor clay courts in Gstaad, Switzerland. It was the 23rd edition of the tournament and was held from July 22 through July 28, 1968. Cliff Drysdale and Annette du Plooy won the singles titles.

Winners

Men's singles
 Cliff Drysdale defeated  Tom Okker 6–3, 6–3, 6–0

Women's singles
 Annette du Plooy defeated  Julie Heldman 6–0, 6–1

Men's doubles
 John Newcombe /  Dennis Ralston defeated  Mal Anderson /  Tom Okker 8–10, 12–10, 12–14, 6–3, 6–3

Women's doubles
 Rosie Reyes /  Annette du Plooy defeated  Helen Amos /  Elena Subirats 6–1, 6–3

Mixed doubles
 Julie Heldman /  Torben Ulrich defeated  Massimo di Domenico /  Elena Subirats 6–2, 6–2

References

External links
 Official website
 ATP – Tournament profile
 ITF – Tournament details

Swiss Open (tennis)
Swiss Open Gstaad
Suisse Open Gstaad